Josh or Joshua McGuire may refer to:

 Josh Maguire (b. 1980), Australian footballer
 Josh McGuire (fencer) (b. 1983), Canadian fencer
 Joshua McGuire (b. 1987), British actor
 Josh McGuire (b. 1990), Australian rugby league footballer